The surname Rose can be of English, Scottish, French, Danish and German origin. The name Ruskin (Rose + Kin) is derived from Rose.

People with the surname Rose
Adam Rose (born 1979), South African professional wrestler
Adele Rose (1933–2020), English television writer
A. J. Rose (born 1997), American football player
 Sir Alan Rose (1899–1975), British colonial judge, Chief Justice of Singapore
Alan Rose (public servant) (born 1944), Australian public servant
Alec Rose (1908–1991), English nursery owner, fruit merchant and amateur single-handed sailor
Alfred Lionel Rose, Australian Army colonel, veterinarian and NT public servant
Anika Noni Rose (born 1972), American singer and actress
Anthony Rose (technology), English technology entrepreneur
Anthony Rose (wine), English wine writer 
Axl Rose (born 1962), American hard rock singer and songwriter
Barbara Rose (1938–2020), American art historian and critic
Barry Rose (born 1934), English choir trainer and organist
Bernard Rose (disambiguation), several people
Buddy Rose (1952–2009), American professional wrestler
Charlie Rose (born 1942), American television interviewer and journalist
Charlie Rose (disambiguation), several people, includes Charles Rose
Christopher Rose (disambiguation), several people, includes Chris Rose
Clan Rose, Scottish clan hailing from the Scottish Highlands
Clifford Rose (1929–2021), English actor
Clive Rose (disambiguation), several people
Cyrille Rose (1830–1902), French clarinetist
Daniel Rose (disambiguation), several people, includes Danny Rose
David Rose (disambiguation), several people, includes Dave Rose
Debi Rose, Member of New York City Council from Council District 49
Derrick Rose (born 1988), American basketball player
Donita Rose (born 1974), American-born Filipino actress and television host
Dorothy H. Rose (1920–2005), American politician
Edith Bullock (1903–1994), American businesswoman and politician born Edith Rose
Edmund Rose (1836–1914), German surgeon
Eileen Rose, American singer-songwriter
Eileen Rose (1909–2003), New Zealand art teacher and artist
Eileen Rose Busby (1922–2005), American antiques appraiser and writer
Ellen Alida Rose (1843–?), American agriculturist, suffragist
Emilio De Rose (1929–2018), Italian dermatologist and politician
Emily Blathwayt née Rose (1852–1940), British suffragette, mother of Mary Blathwayt; Eagle House home was "Suffragette's Rest", planted trees for hunger strikers
Erica Rose (born 1982), American long-distance swimmer
Esther Rose (1901–1990), American painter, mother of Eileen Rose Busby
Felipe Rose (born 1954), American musician, founding member of The Village People
Fred Rose (politician) (1907–1983), Canadian politician and trade unionist convicted of spying for the Soviet Union
Frederick P. Rose (1923–1999), American real estate developer 
Gene Rose (1913–1986), American football player
Gene H. Rose (1904–1979), American football player
George Rose (disambiguation), several people
Gideon Rose (born 1964), American magazine editor
Gillian Rose (1947–1995), English philosopher
Gillian Rose (geographer) (born 1962), British geographer
Glenola Rose (1918-1935), American chemist and founder of the Women's Service Committee of the American Chemical Society
Graham Rose (disambiguation), several people
Gregory Rose (disambiguation), several people, includes Greg Rose
Gustav Rose (1798–1873), German mineralogist, father of Edmund Rose
H. J. Rose (1883–1961), British classical scholar
Heinrich Rose (1795–1864), German mineralogist, brother of Gustav Rose
Hilary Rose (disambiguation), several people
Hilly Rose, American talk radio broadcaster
Horace Arthur Rose (1867–1933), British civil servant in India and author 
Hugh Rose, 1st Baron Strathnairn (1801–1885), German-born Irish field marshal of the British army
Hugh James Rose (1795–1838), English theologian
Jack Rose (disambiguation), several people
Jacqueline Rose (born 1949), English academic
Jalen Rose (born 1973), American basketball player and sportscaster
James Rose, Australian Rules footballer
James Rose (Australian politician) (1849–1939), Australian politician
James A. Rose (1850–1912), American politician
James C. Rose (1913–1991), American landscape architect
Jim Rose (disambiguation), several people
John Rose (disambiguation), several people
Jon Rose (born 1951), English-born Australian violinist
Jonathan F.P. Rose (born 1952), American real estate developer
Jonny Rose, Monstercat vocalist, also goes by Colordrive on the label
Joseph Nelson Rose (1862–1928), American botanist using the standard author abbreviation "Rose"
Judd Rose (1955–2000), American journalist, son of Hilly Rose
Justin Rose (born 1980), English professional golfer
Karen Rose, American romance novelist
Kay Rose (1922–2002), American sound editor
Kevin Rose (born 1977), American entrepreneur, co-founder of Digg
Kevin Rose (disambiguation), several people
Larry Rose III (born 1995), American football player
Lee Rose, American lighting designer
Lee Rose, American basketball coach
Lee Rose, American director, producer and writer
Lee Rose, Australian Rugby League player
Leonard Rose (1918–1984), American cellist
Leonard Rose (hacker) (born 1959), American computer hacker
Lila Rose (born 1988), American anti-abortion activist
Lionel Rose, Australian boxer
M. Richard Rose (1933–2021), American academic executive
Martha Parmelee Rose (1834-1923), American journalist, reformer and philanthropist
Mauri Rose (1906–1981), American racecar driver, three-time winner of the Indianapolis 500
Maurice Rose (1899–1945), American World War II army general
Max Rose (born 1986), US Congressman from New York's 11th congressional district
Mercedes Rose (born 1972), American actress
Mervyn Rose, Australian tennis player
Mia Rose (born 1988), English singer
Michael Rose (disambiguation), several people
Murray Rose (1939–2012), Australian swimmer, medalist in the 1956 and 1960 Olympic Games
Murray Rose (politician) (1939–2021), New Zealand politician
Nancy Rose, American economist
Nectar Rose (born 1974), American actress
Nikolas Rose (born 1947), British sociologist
Norman Rose, American actor
Nubia Rose, (born 1964) Brazilian singer and actress
Pamela Rose (1917–2021), British actress and wartime intelligence worker
Paul Rose (disambiguation), several people
Pete Rose (born 1941), American baseball player
Peter Rose (disambiguation), several people, includes other people named Pete Rose
Quinton Rose (born 1998), American basketball player
Randy Rose (born 1956), American professional wrestler
Reginald Rose (1920–2002), American film and television writer
Richard Rose (disambiguation), several people
Robert Rose (disambiguation), several people
Roger Rose (born 1958), American actor
Romani Rose (born 1946), German Romany activist
S. L. Rose (1818–1887), American politician and judge in Wisconsin and Iowa
Seraphim Rose (1934–1982), American orthodox monk and writer, son of Esther Rose
Sheena Rose, Caribbean artist
Stephan Rose, Guyanese boxer
Steven Rose (born 1938), English academic and activist, brother of Nikolas Rose
Stuart Rose (born 1949), British businessman
Thomas Rose, Australian politician
Thomas E. Rose (1830–1907), American general 
Tim Rose (1940–2002), American singer-songwriter
Tim Rose (American football) (born 1941), American football coach and player
Timothy M. Rose (born 1956), British actor and puppeteer
Valentin Rose (disambiguation), several people
Verona Rose, English television presenter and actress
Xiaohong Rose Yang, biomedical scientist
Walter Rose (disambiguation), several people
Whitney Rose, American country musician
Wilfred Andrew Rose (1922–2008), Trinidad and Tobago diplomat and politician
William Rose (disambiguation), several people, includes Bill Rose and Billy Rose

Fictional characters
Amy Rose, a character in the Sonic the Hedgehog franchise
Johnny, Moira, David, and Alexis Rose, the main characters in the television show Schitt's Creek
Mila Rose, in the manga/anime series Bleach
Ruby Rose (RWBY character), in the animated web series RWBY

Distribution
United Kingdom

As a surname, Rose is the 69th most common surname, with 89,001 bearers. It has the highest concentration in Luton where it is the most common surname, with 4,858 bearers, and is the most prevalent in Greater London, where it is the 20th most common surname with 11,246 bearers. Other concentrations include, City of Leeds, (11th,4,840), Surrey (14th,8,056), Ceredigion, (38th,1,718), Staffordshire, (55th,3,298), North Lanarkshire, (94th,1,666), Essex, (101st,4,784), South Yorkshire, (101st,3,212), Belfast, (268th,1,632), Cardiff, (272nd,1,618), Bristol, (324th,1,662), Merseyside, (498th,1,624), West Yorkshire, (509th,1,648), Cheshire, (540th,1,624), Kent, (816th,1,614), and Lancashire, (843rd,1,730).

See also
 Justice Rose (disambiguation)
 Ruby Rose Langenheim (born 1986), Australian actress, model and musician; stage name "Ruby Rose" without surname
 Rosé (surname)
 Roser (name), given name and surname
 Rose (given name)
 Roos (surname)

References

English-language surnames
French-language surnames
German-language surnames
Surnames of English origin
Surnames of Scottish origin